Silver perch is a common name for several fishes and may refer to:

Bairdiella chrysoura, native to the east coast of the United States
Bidyanus bidyanus, endemic to Australia
Leiopotherapon plumbeus, endemic to the Philippines